Asociación Deportiva Agropecuaria (sometimes referred as ADA) is a Peruvian football club, playing in the city of Jaén, Cajamarca, Peru.

History
The Asociación Deportiva Agropecuaria was founded on May 12, 1953.

In the 2006 Copa Perú, the club classified to the National Stage, but was eliminated by Corazón Micaelino in the Round of 16.

In the 2014 Copa Perú, the club classified to the Regional Stage, but was eliminated by Sport Chavelines.

In the 2018 Copa Perú, the club classified to the National Stage, but was eliminated.

Rivalries
ADA has had a long-standing rivalry with local club Bracamoros.

Honours

Regional
Región II:
Winners (1): 2006

Liga Departamental de Cajamarca:
Winners (7): 1982, 1984, 1986, 1987, 1990, 1994, 2006
Runner-up (2): 2014, 2018

Liga Provincial de Jaén:
Winners (4): 2014, 2017, 2018, 2019
Runner-up (3): 2008, 2012, 2013

Liga Distrital de Jaén:
Winners (5): 2008, 2012, 2013, 2014
Runner-up (1): 2019

See also
List of football clubs in Peru
Peruvian football league system

References

External links
 

Football clubs in Peru
Association football clubs established in 1953
1953 establishments in Peru